Naryn Castle or Narenj Castle is a castle in the city of Nain, Iran, and is one of the attractions of Nain County. This castle was built by the Parthian Empire.

Gallery

References 

Castles in Iran
Parthian castles
National works of Iran
Parthian architecture